Raithuwa  is a village in Sohawal tehsil in Faizabad District of the Indian state of Uttar Pradesh, India. The nearest town to Raithuwa is Bhadarsa which is 6 km away. Raituwa is 19 km south of district headquarters Ayodhya city.

As of May 2021, the village is headed by Pradhan Shri Mo Ishtiyaq.

Geography
Masodha Block, which Raithuwa is located within, is bordered by Pura Bazar Block to the east, Bikapur Block to the south, Faizabad Block to the north, and Hariyangatanganj Block to the west.

Transport
This village is directly connected to Sultanpur, Uttar Pradesh, Bahraich, Gonda, Basti, Azamgarh, Akbarpur, Ambedkar Nagar, Varansi, Faizabad, Ayodhya, Lucknow, Kanpur and other big cities by public bus and private bus as well.

Railway Station
The nearest Railway station of the village is Bharat Kund Railway Station that is approximately 4 km.

Demographics
According to the 2011 Census of India, the village had a population of 3200 people, with roughly equivalent numbers of males and females. Raithuwa has a below-average literacy rate compared to the rest of Uttar Pradesh. In 2011, the literacy rate of Raithuwa was 65.12% compared to the Uttar Pradesh average of 67.68%. In Raithuwa, the male literacy stands significantly higher than that of female literacy with the male literacy rate at 75.32% and the female literacy rate at 55.15%. The population of children under six years old was more than 500, About 20% of the total population.

As per the constitution of India and Panchyati Raaj Act, Raithuwa is administrated by a sarpanch, who is the elected representative of the village. There is also a post office within the village.

Education
There are two schools in the village, one a government-run primary school and the other a Urdu language secondary school. Within a 5 km radius of the village there are approximately 10 schools, including 4 English language secondary schools and 5 Undergraduate schools.

Festivals

Hindu festivals 

According to Hindu calendar Vikram Samvat lunar calendar chaitra is considered as first month. Hindu festivals celebrated include Navaratri and Rama Navami,. Rakshabandhan, Deepawali, and Holi.

Muslim festivals 
The Muslim calendar begins with the month of Muharram.
Muslim festivals celebrated including Eid-ul-Fitr, and Bakra Eid.

Photos from the village

See also
Nandigram (Bharat Kund)
Bharat Kund Railway Station

References

Villages in Faizabad district